Schwaz is a city in the Austrian state of Tyrol. It is the administrative center of the Schwaz district. Schwaz is located in the lower Inn valley.

Location
Schwaz lies in the middle of the Lower Inn Valley at the foot of the Kellerjoch and Eiblschrofen mountains.

Neighbouring communities include: Buch bei Jenbach, Fügenberg, Gallzein, Pill, Stans, and Vomp.

History
The Counts of Tyrol guarded Schwaz from nearby Burg Freundsberg. At the town's height during the 15th and 16th centuries, it was an important silver mining center, providing mineral wealth for both the Fugger banking family and, through them, for the Austrian emperors. During this period, its population of about 20,000 inhabitants made it the second largest city in the Austrian Empire, after Vienna.

Schwaz received its city rights in 1898 by Emperor Franz Joseph I of Austria.

Population

Personalities
Schwaz is the birthplace of 16th-century pulpit orator Georg Scherer and 20th-century philosopher Hans Köchler.
It is also the birthplace of the 20th c. Austrian economist and a Roman Catholic priest, Johannes Messner.

Economy
Three large industrial companies have their headquarters in Schwaz:
 Tyrolit – a globally active producer of bonded abrasives
 Adler Lacke – a family-run producer of coating systems
 DAKA – a regional waste management company

International relations

Twin towns – Sister cities
Schwaz is twinned with:

Gallery

References

External links 

 Web site of the municipality of Schwaz (German)
 Schwaz Silver Mine  (German)
 official tourism information of Schwaz  (English)

Cities and towns in Schwaz District